Nyala (Daju: "the place of chatting") is the capital of the state of South Darfur in the south-west of Sudan.

History
Nyala was the capital of the Daju Empire, which was established around Jebel Um-Kurdós. However, many sites of ancient antiquities, pottery, engraved pictures of battles, horses, animals and hunting are still awaiting further scientific archaeological work at Jebel Daju. The most important archaeological sites undiscovered yet are Nari, Kedingnyir, Dobo, Simiat Hills, Jebel Keima, Kalokitting, Jebel Wara, and Jebel Marra itself. 

When the United Kingdom conquered the present-day Sudan, the British commander-in-chief met Sultan Adam Suleiman in 1932, seeking his advice for his knowledge of the best places in terms of availability of water sources and land topography in order to establish the British Administration Headquarters in Darfur. Sultan Adam Suleiman had chosen Nyala for that purpose. 

During the ongoing Darfur conflict, thousands of internally displaced persons have gathered near the city in the hopes of protection. The refugee camp in the southern portion of Nyala is Kalma. Around 90,000 people reside in the camp.

Economy

Local industries produce textiles, as well as processed food and leather goods. Nyala has terminus ends for both road and railway, and also has a domestic airport, Nyala Airport. Nyala serves as a trading place for gum arabic and has branches of the Agricultural Bank of Sudan and the People's Cooperative Bank. Nyala is home to Nyala University, a public university.

Water infrastructure 
Nyala suffers from severe water infrastructure problems caused by droughts and poor water management, including poor source treatment and delivery methods. Most of the water used in and around Nyala is ground water; this is heavily contaminated due to human activity, bearing the consequences of inadequate waste management and lack of proper sanitation. Water resources in the city have tested to contain bacteria levels higher than permissible amounts, which in turn creates health issues. In many cases the water collected for distribution is not properly chlorinated, allowing further increase in bacteria levels.

Education 
The educational institutions in the country nearly doubled between the years of 2000 and 2010. In the year 2000 there were 135 primary schools and 58 secondary schools; in 2010 there were 308 primary schools and 106 secondary schools. The main concern with the educational system in the city is the quality of the education. The schools’ staff is underpaid and unqualified for adequate teaching in these institutions. The government often does not commit to their financial responsibility with the schools. This affects the schools’ operations and burdens the schools to invest from their resources. Also, many children do not attend school so they can work and add to their family’s income.

Climate
Despite receiving almost  of rainfall annually, Nyala has a marginal hot desert climate (Köppen climate classification BWh), just below a hot semi-desert climate (BSh), owing to the extremely high potential evapotranspiration.

The Amel Center 
Run by Mossaad Mohamed Ali Mossaad and former Secretary-General of the United Nations Kofi Annan, the Amel Center is a treatment and rehabilitation center in Nyala for victims of torture. The center has earned Mossaad and Annan the Olof Palme Prize. Mohammed Ahmed Abdallah served as director of the center until 2007, earning the Robert F. Kennedy Human Rights Award for his work.

Notes

References 
 Arckell, A.J., History of Darfur 1200-1700 A.D. SNR.
 UNESCO General History of Africa, Vol. IV, Abridged Edition: Africa from the Twelfth to the Sixteenth Century (UNESCO General History of Africa) by Joseph Ki-Zerbo and DjiBril Tamsir Niane (Paperback - May 10, 1998) – Abridged
 Buchanan-Smith, M. (2011, January). City limits: Urbanisation and vulnerability in Suda [Pdf]. ODI.
 Abdelrahman, A. A., & Eltahir, Y. M. (2010). Bacteriological quality of drinking water in Nyala, South Darfur, Sudan. Environmental Monitoring and Assessment, 175(1-4), 37- 43. doi:10.1007/s10661-010-1491-7

External links 

 Adventures of Sudan: Nyala
 Historical weather for Nyala

Populated places in South Darfur
Darfur
State capitals in Sudan